Barnstable's Old Gaol is a historic colonial jail in Barnstable, Massachusetts.  Built 1690, it is the oldest wooden jail in the United States of America.

The jail was built by order of the Plymouth and Massachusetts Bay Colony courts. It served as the Barnstable County jail until 1820, when a new stone jail was built. The structure, which held about six prisoners, was eventually attached to a barn. In 1968 it was rediscovered, separated from the barn, and moved 100 feet onto the grounds of the Coast Guard Heritage Museum (located in the old Customshouse building) in Barnstable Village.

The building was listed on the National Register of Historic Places in 1971, and included in the Old King's Highway Historic District in 1987.

In 1716, the jail imprisoned Goody Hallett, the lover of pirate Samuel Bellamy, later known as the Witch of Wellfleet, as well as the two survivors of Sam Bellamy's flagship Whydah Gally which wrecked at Wellfleet, and the seven survivors of his consort ship Mary Anne which wrecked ten miles south at Pochet Island. The jail house is considered one of the most haunted in America and is open to ghost tours at certain times of the year. It is believed to be haunted by Goody Hallett, who is said to also haunt the Expedition Whydah in Provincetown, as well as Lucifer Land (also called Goody Hallett's Meadow) which is a reference to the area of land at the top of the Wellfleet cliffs.

See also
National Register of Historic Places listings in Barnstable County, Massachusetts

References

External links
 Official web site of caretakers
 Coast Guard Heritage Museum

Government buildings completed in 1690
Defunct prisons in Massachusetts
Jails on the National Register of Historic Places in Massachusetts
Buildings and structures in Barnstable, Massachusetts
Museums in Barnstable County, Massachusetts
Prison museums in the United States
Jails in Massachusetts
National Register of Historic Places in Barnstable, Massachusetts
Historic district contributing properties in Massachusetts
1690 establishments in Massachusetts